Cadogan Keatinge (1720-1799) was an Anglican priest in Ireland in the second half of the 18th-century.

Bagwell was born in Reading, Berkshire and educated at Trinity College, Dublin. He was Dean of Clogher from 1781 to 1799. In 1786 he gave refuge in the glebe house in Narraghmore, his family seat, to Rollo Gillespie, who had just killed an opponent in a duel.

References

Irish Anglicans
Alumni of Trinity College Dublin
Deans of Clogher
1721 births
1799 deaths
People from Reading, Berkshire